Asterix and the Goths is the third volume of the Asterix comic book series, by René Goscinny (stories) and Albert Uderzo (illustrations). It was first published in 1963 in French and translated into English in 1974.

Plot summary
Asterix and Obelix, nervous about Getafix traveling alone to the annual druids' conference in the Forest of the Carnutes, accompany him on his journey and remain outside the forest during the conference. Meanwhile, on the Roman Empire's border, two legionaries are captured by a band of Goths (Tartaric, Esoteric, Atmospheric, Prehistoric, and Choleric), intending to kidnap the Druid of the Year and use his skills to conquer Gaul and Rome.

En route to the Forest, Asterix, Obelix, and Getafix meet another druid, Valueaddedtax, who uses his magical powers to convince the Romans to let them pass. At the edge of the Forest of the Carnutes, Getafix and his friend leave Asterix and Obelix for the druid's conference. Unaware that the Goth band is hiding nearby, the druids enter their inventions in a contest, in which Getafix wins the "Golden Menhir" prize with his potion, which gives superhuman strength. As he leaves his colleagues, the Goths take him prisoner. Asterix and Obelix, fearing for their friend's safety after they do not see him leave the Forest, enter the woods and find a Visigoth helmet (actually a pickelhaube like those worn by Germans during the first years of World War I). They instantly set out towards the east (thoroughly confusing Obelix) to rescue Getafix.

Unfortunately, they run into another Roman patrol, which spots the helmet Asterix is carrying and mistakes them for Goths (who are wanted for assaulting Roman border guards). Obelix and Asterix easily defeat the Romans, but the Roman general is informed of the incident and sends out pictures of Asterix and Obelix with a reward for their capture.

Asterix has the bright idea of disguising himself and Obelix as Romans and ambush two legionaries, stealing their armor and weapons and leaving them tied up and gagged. Two other legionaries, searching for the Goths, come across our heroes, in which Obelix's laughter at what they should say if they meet other Romans almost blows his and Asterix's cover. Soon after, the two legionaries spot the two tied-up Romans and mistake them for Asterix and Obelix, "a fat one and a little one". Thinking another Legionary captured them and has gone for reinforcements, they decide to take the reward, and take the prisoners to the general's tent. When the captives are ungagged, however, the full story comes out, and the Romans promptly begin capturing each other left and right, believing each other to be Goths, much to the disappointment of the General. Asterix and Obelix, back in Gaulish clothing, are completely untouched, along with the Goths, who approach the border.

The Goths cross the Roman Empire's border back into Germania, stunning a young legionary whose eagerness to report an invasion becomes a running gag. (He initially reports an "invasion" of Goths invading the Goths, then an invasion of Gauls crossing into Germania — which his centurion dismisses as their territory is not the one being invaded—, and then finally reports the Gauls returning to Gaul, which causes him to get 8 days inside). They present the druid first to a customs officer, who at first refuses to let them through on charges of importing foreign goods. Eventually, the Goths present Getafix to their Gothic chieftain, Metric, calls in a Gaulish-Gothic translator, Rhetoric, who is threatened to be executed if he does not convince Getafix to cooperate and brew magic potion. Although Getafix flatly refuses, Rhetoric lies and says that he has agreed to do so in a week's time, at the New Moon.

Meanwhile, Asterix and Obelix also stun the young legionary and enter the Gothic lands. While running into a Gothic border patrol, Obelix stupidly uses the cover up names he and Asterix used for their Roman disguises, making the patrol think the Gauls are Romans. After Asterix and Obelix beat up the patrol, they disguise themselves as Goths by attacking two of them, infiltrating their barracks as members of the army. They escape from the Gothic army, but are soon captured again by the Goths and thrown in jail along with Rhetoric, who was also trying to flee. Although they are thrown in prison, Obelix easily breaks the door (another running gag) and they flee, taking Rhetoric with them to question. While at first he pretends to speak only Gothic, Rhetoric accidentally reveals that he can speak Gaulish and is forced to spill the beans. While trying to sneak into the Gothic town, Rhetoric screams and attracts a patrol. Although Asterix and Obelix beat up the patrol, they surrender to the last standing man to be brought to the Chief.

The Gauls are brought before Metric. Getafix reveals that he can actually speak Gothic and informs Metric that Rhetoric had been deceiving him. Once again, Rhetoric is thrown in jail with the Gauls, and they are all sentenced to execution. Asterix, Obelix and Getafix devise a scheme in which many Goths are given magic potion, so that they spend time and energy fighting each other for chieftainship instead of invading Gaul and Rome, making Rhetoric play a part in it. Under the pretext of cooking a last Gaulish soup, Getafix gives the jailer a list of ingredients and brews the potion when he acquires them. During the public execution, Rhetoric asks to go first. Full of magic potion, he resists all attempts at torture, and beats up Metric, throwing him in jail and making himself Chieftain of the Goths. The Gauls visit Metric in his prison, and give him magic potion. As the two Chieftains had the same magic potion in them, a direct fight proves futile and each storms off, promising to raise an army.

The Gauls wander around the town, giving potions to any Goth who looks browbeaten and who would be glad of a chance of power (their first two candidates being Electric, who is poor and has to sweep up streets, and Euphoric, who is being bossed about by his dictator-like wife). The would-be Chieftains each raise an army, and a confusing set of conflicts begins, known as the "Asterixian Wars", thus successfully sowing so much discord in Germania that the tribes be more occupied with fighting each other rather than trying to invade other countries.

Although their peace-keeping mission probably created more casualties than a Gothic invasion of Rome would, the three Gauls make it back to Gaul, again running into the over-eager young legionary at the border, return home confident and are welcomed with open arms by the village, who throw their usual banquet in celebration.

Background

The story, written less than two decades after the end of World War II, mocks the Goths and depicts them as villainous characters. Albert Uderzo later expressed regret over the Germanophobic tone and in later Astérix stories, like Asterix the Legionary, Germans are portrayed as more sympathetic characters. Asterix and the Goths was translated in West Germany at the time, but the translators had added political propaganda against East Germany without Goscinny and Uderzo's knowledge. When the Astérix creators found this out they immediately demanded these elements to be removed.

References

External links 
Official English Website

Goths, Asterix and the
Works originally published in Pilote
Literature first published in serial form
1963 graphic novels
Works by René Goscinny
Comics by Albert Uderzo
Comics set in Germany
Cultural depictions of German people
Anti-German sentiment in Europe
Goths
Ethnic humour